Haseen Ahmed (born 10 January 1954) is an Indian former cricketer. He played first-class cricket for Bengal and Uttar Pradesh.

See also
 List of Bengal cricketers

References

External links
 

1954 births
Living people
Indian cricketers
Bengal cricketers
Uttar Pradesh cricketers
Cricketers from Allahabad